Sarah Scherer (born February 12, 1991, in Salt Lake City) is an American sports shooter. She competed  at the 2012 Summer Olympics, finishing in 7th place at Women's 10 metre air rifle.  In the same event in the 2016 Summer Olympics in Rio de Janeiro she finished 8th.  At the 2016 Summer Olympics, she also competed in the women's 50 m rifle - 3 positions event, finishing in 33rd place.  She had previously won a junior silver medal in this event in 2010.

Sarah's elder brother Stephen Scherer was also a sports shooter who competed in the 10 metre air rifle of the 2008 Olympic Games.

References

External links
 Bio on london2012.com

Living people
American female sport shooters
Olympic shooters of the United States
Shooters at the 2012 Summer Olympics
Shooters at the 2016 Summer Olympics
1991 births
Sportspeople from Salt Lake City
TCU Horned Frogs rifle shooters
21st-century American women